Irbeysky District is an administrative and municipal district (raion), one of the forty-three in Krasnoyarsk Krai, Russia. It is located in the southwest of the krai and borders with Kansky and Ilansky Districts in the north, Irkutsk Oblast in the east and south, Rybinsky District in the southwest, and with Sayansky District in the west. Its administrative center is the rural locality (a selo) of Irbeyskoye. Population:  19,181 (2002 Census);  The population of Irbeyskoye accounts for 27.9% of the district's total population.

History
The district was founded on April 4, 1924.

References

Notes

Sources



Districts of Krasnoyarsk Krai
States and territories established in 1924